Cristoforo Negri (1809-1896) was an Italian geographer, economist and diplomat.

Biography

Cristoforo Negri was born in Padua in 1809.  
He became a professor of constitutional law at the University of Padua.
Following the upheavals of 1848 he fled to Piedmont, where he was appointed to the consular division of the Ministry of Foreign Affairs by Vincenzo Gioberti.
He was confirmed in this position by Massimo d'Azeglio.
From 1859 he held various government posts in the course of which he visited many cities in the Mediterranean to develop Italian political and economic relationships.

Commenting on the 1867 expedition of the corvette Magenta to the Pacific, Negri pointed out that it was far too heavily loaded with arms and far too short of maps, books and scientific instruments to truly be meant as a voyage of exploration. 
He was the Italian consul general in Hamburg from 1874 to 1875.
After retiring, he continued to represent his country.
He participated in the 1876 conference held by King Leopold II of Belgium on founding the International African Association, in a conference on the construction of the Panama Canal, and in the Berlin Conference of 1884-1885 in which Africa was carved up among the European colonial powers.

In 1880 Negri was again President of the Geographical Society.
He endorsed a plan by the explorer Giacomo Bove to undertake a circumnavigation of Antarctica.
However, the newly formed Italian state was not able to afford the cost.
In 1890 he was made a senator. He died in Florence in 1896.

Writings

Memorie storico-politiche dei Greci e dei Romani (Historical and political memories of the Greeks and Romans), Turin, 1842.

 

I passati viaggi antartici e l'ideata spedizione italiana: Riflessi (Past Antarctic travel and concept of an Italian expedition: Reflections), Genova, Istituto de' Sordo-Muti, 1880.

Notes and references
Citations

Sources

1809 births
1896 deaths
19th-century Italian diplomats
19th-century Italian writers
Academic staff of the University of Padua
Italian geographers
19th-century Italian economists